Free Radical Research, formerly Free Radical Research Communications, is an academic journal that publishes research papers, hypotheses, and reviews on free radicals, redox signaling, antioxidants, and oxidative damage. It is published by Informa Healthcare.

Core Therapeutic Areas 

 Free radicals and other reactive species in biological, clinical, environmental and other systems
 Antioxidants, including diet-derived antioxidants and other relevant aspects of human nutrition
 Oxidative damage, mechanisms and measurement
 Redox signaling

Editors-in-Chief 
Michael Davies and Helmut Sies are the Editors-in-Chief of Free Radical Research.

Publication Format 
Free Radical Research publishes 12 issues per year in simultaneous print and online editions.

References

External links
Free Radical Research homepage of Free Radical Research

Publications established in 1985
Biology journals
Monthly journals